Jonathan Dasnières de Veigy and David Guez were the defending champions but decided not to participate.
Michael Linzer and Gerald Melzer won the title, defeating Niels Desein and André Ghem 6–1, 7–6(7–3) in the final.

Seeds

Draw

Draw

References
 Main Draw

Tampere Open - Doubles
2012 Doubles